Per Law No.40/98/AN in 1998, Burkina Faso adhered to decentralization to provide administrative and financial autonomy to local communities. Most of these, according to their individual articles, were implemented on 2 July 2001.

Burkina Faso is divided into 13 administrative regions. Each region is administered by a governor.

These regions are divided into 45 provinces and subdivided into 351 communes.

See also
List of regions of Burkina Faso by Human Development Index
Provinces of Burkina Faso
Departments/Communes of Burkina Faso
Geography of Burkina Faso
ISO 3166-2:BF

References

See also
 Regions of Burkina Faso at Statoids.com

 
Subdivisions of Burkina Faso
Burkina Faso, Regions
Burkina Faso 1
Regions, Burkina Faso
Burkina Faso geography-related lists